Duke Zao of Qin (died 429 BC) was from 442 to 429 BC the 23rd ruler of the Zhou Dynasty Chinese state of Qin that eventually united China to become the Qin Dynasty.  His ancestral name was Ying (嬴), and Duke Zao was his posthumous title.  Duke Zao succeeded his father Duke Ligong of Qin, who died in 443 BC, as ruler of Qin.

In 441 BC, the Qin city of Nanzheng (in present-day Hanzhong) rebelled.  In 430 BC, the Rong state of Yiqu invaded Qin, advancing to the Wei River.

Duke Zao reigned for fourteen years and died in 429 BC.  He was succeeded by his younger brother Duke Huai of Qin, who had been exiled in the State of Jin.

References

Year of birth unknown
Rulers of Qin
5th-century BC Chinese monarchs
429 BC deaths